Burhan al-Din Ibrahim ibn Hassan ibn Shihab al-Din al-Kurani al-Madani (1023-1101 AH, or 1615-1690 CE), was a Gorani Kurdish Sufi master (murshid) and Athari theologian who was born in the village of Shahrani in Shahrizor plain. He was also attributed with al-Kurdi, al-Shahrazuri, and al-Shahrani. He studied and was a member of several Sufi orders (tariqa), especially the Naqshbandi, the Qadiri, and the Shattari. In Medina, he became Ahmad al-Qushashi's prominent and influential student, and succeeded Al-Qushashi as the leader of his order. His writings cover various Islamic subjects, including jurisprudence (fiqh), theology (tawhid), and Sufism.

Study 
Al-Kurani first went to study religion in Turkey, then he visited the scholars in Persia, Iraq, Syria, and Egypt to further his knowledge, before finally settling in Medina until his death. In Egypt, he visited Al-Azhar and studied Taysir fi al-Qira'at al-Sab'a of Abu 'Amru Ad-Dani al-Qurtubi with Nur al-Din Ali bin Ali al-Shabramallisi, as well as Thayyibat al-Nashr fi al-Qira'at al-'Ashr of Ibn al-Jazari. In Egypt he also studied with 'Azayim Sultan ibn Ahmad al-Marakhi; and with Muhammad ibn 'Ala' al-Din al-Babili, a well-known hadith expert. In Damascus, he studied with Muhammad ibn Muhammad al-'Arami. In Medina, he studied with Ahmad al-Qushashi, Ahmad al-Shinnawi, Mulla Muhammad Sharif ibn Yusuf al-Kurani, and Abdul Karim ibn Abi Bakr al-Hussaini al-Kurani.

Teaching 
Both in teaching and in writing, Al-Kurani emphasized the harmony between Sufism and its scholastic theology (kalam) with sharia. He considered the various branches of Islamic knowledge as paths toward the same true understanding of tawhid (the oneness of God). Although Al-Kurani continued to delve into the teachings of Ibn 'Arabi and Al-Jili, he emphasized more on the compatibility between different points of view rather than choosing one of them. Al-Kurani's attitude is also reflected in his choice to follow more than one Sufi orders (tariqa), as was done by his master Al-Qushashi.

Influence 
Al-Kurani was a well-known scholar of his time, and he was allowed to teach at the Prophet's Mosque. Al-Jabarti called him the sheikh of sheikhs (shaikh al-shuyukh), whose students came from various countries. He was respected by students in the Hejaz, and he was widely known by scholars from India and Malay archipelago (Jawi). He had a close relationship with Abd al-Rauf al-Sinkili, and remained in touch after Al-Sinkili returned to Aceh. Mustafa al-Hamawi noted that many other Southeast Asian students also maintained relationships with Al-Kurani.

Works 
Al-Kurani's written works are estimated to be more than a hundred, but most of them are not yet widely published. His work Ithaf al-Dhaki bi Sharh al-Tuhfat al-Mursalat ila al-Nabi discusses Al-Tuhfat al-Mursalat ila Ruh al-Nabi of Muhammad bin Fadhlullah al-Burhanpuri, which was made at the request of his relations in the archipelago. In addition, his work Al-Lum'at al-Saniyat fi Tahqiq al-Ilqa' fi al-Umniya discusses monotheism and Sufism, and Al-Amam li-Iqaz al-Himam discusses his biography and intellectual credentials as a teacher.

See also 
 Ahmad al-Qushashi
 Ahmad al-Shinnawi
 Shattari

References 

Sufi religious leaders
1615 births
1690 deaths
Mujaddid
17th-century Muslim scholars of Islam
Atharis
Kurdish Sufis
17th-century Kurdish people